The European qualification for the 2019 World Women's Handball Championship, in Japan, was played over two rounds.

In the first round of qualification, 16 teams who were not participating at the 2018 European Championship were split into four groups. Each winner from the four groups and the best 2nd-placed team joined the remaining 12 teams from the European Championship and Austria as the second-best third-ranked team from the 2018 European Championship qualification and played play-offs to determine the nine qualifiers.

Qualification phase 1

Seeding
The draw was held on 24 June 2016. The winner from each group and the best second-ranked team advanced to the play-off round. Each group played their matches in a mini-tournament at a pre-selected location.

All times are local.

Group 1

Group 2

Group 3

Group 4

Ranking of second-placed teams

Qualification phase 2
The draw was held on 15 December 2018 at Paris. The teams played a home-and away series to determine the participants for the final tournament.

Seedings

Overview

|}

All times are local.

Matches

Germany won 49–45 on aggregate.

Denmark won 61–36 on aggregate.

Sweden won 78–42 on aggregate.

Norway won 65–49 on aggregate.

Serbia won 60–49 on aggregate.

49–49 on aggregate. Montenegro won by away goals.

Slovenia won 71–57 on aggregate.

Hungary won 69–42 on aggregate.

Spain won 66–58 on aggregate.

References

External links
Official website

2018 in women's handball
2019 in women's handball
World Handball Championship tournaments
Qualification for handball competitions